Dunga Gali is one of the towns of the Galyat area of Ayubia National Park, at an altitude of   in northern Pakistan. Dunga Gali is located in Nathia Gali Union Council (subdivision) of Abbottabad District in the Khyber Pakhtunkhwa Province.

History 

During British Rule, Dunga Gali served as a sanatorium to British soldiers and contained a hotel, church and a post office. The area was also visited by Europeans, who also had houses on the southern slopes of the nearby Mukeshpuri Mountains.

See also
Nathia Gali
Ghora Gali
Ayubia National Park

References

Hill stations in Pakistan
Populated places in Abbottabad District
Galyat of Pakistan